is a Japanese joshi puroresu-themed manga series written by ESE and illustrated by Kiyohito Natsuki. It was serialized in Earth Star Entertainment's Comic Earth Star from March 2011 to December 2013. An anime television series adaptation by Arms aired from October to December 2013.

Plot
Sakura Hagiwara is a pop idol and member of the fictional Japanese idol group Sweet Diva. One day, however, a female wrestler named Rio Kazama beats up Elena Miyazawa, a fellow Sweet Diva member and Sakura's rival. To avenge Elena, Sakura is introduced to the Berserk Wrestlers team, of which Rio is a part of. Eventually, Sakura proves to be a natural athlete with potential and joins the team.

Characters

Sweet Diva

A 17-year-old girl who is a member of the idol group Sweet Diva. She becomes the central vocalist at the start of the series. Initially cheerful and bright, she always puts her idol group before her own feelings but always tries her best at anything.

A 17-year-old girl who is member of the idol group Sweet Diva. She is Sakura's rival who is a tomboy and strong-minded.

A member of the idol group Sweet Diva who is always seen together with Yuuho. Although bright and cheerful like Sakura, Aika is also a bit timid.

A member of the idol group Sweet Diva who is always seen together with Aika. She is the mood maker of the group.

Sweet Diva's leader. Like Elena and Sakura, she is 17 years old, but acts way older and is really calm.

Sweet Diva's manager.

Berserk Wrestlers

A mid-class wrestler who was the one who attacked Elena.

Berserk's Ace pro wrestler, she too was a former idol like Sakura. She is usually seen together with Kanae.

The President of Berserk, an ex-pro wrestler who is 51 years old.

 A karate prodigy and Inoba's mentor's granddaughter. She became interested in pro wrestling because of Sakura. Her style in the ring incorporates elements of karate together with pro wrestling, and she uses powerful blows to stagger her opponent.

Other characters

An enthusiastic news reporter who loves pro wrestling.

Renowned world champion pro wrestler and Misaki's mentor. Like Misaki, she sees Sakura's potential, prompting Jackal to challenge her in a wrestling match.

The owner of Miyabi and another of Jackal's students. She is considered to be Misaki's rival. 
Blue Panther
She is a masked pro wrestler "assassin" that works for Miyabi. She tends to be a show-off, is a bit of a brute and is despised by Sakura because of it.

Media

Manga
Written by ESE and illustrated by Kiyohito Natsuki, Wanna Be the Strongest in the World! was serialized in Earth Star Entertainment's Comic Earth Star from March 12, 2011, to December 12, 2013. Its chapters were collected in five tankōbon, published from October 12, 2011, to December 12, 2013.

Volume list

Drama CD
On October 12, 2011, a drama CD was released with the first volume of the manga, with Aki Toyosaki voicing Sakura and Yōko Hikasa voicing Elena.

Anime
An anime television series adaptation was formally announced on April 1, 2013. The series was produced by Arms and directed by Rion Kujo, with character designs provided by Rin Shin. It aired from October 6 to December 22, 2013 on AT-X, Tokyo MX, and YTV. An OVA episode is bundled in each Blu-ray and DVD volume of the series.

The series is licensed in North America by Funimation. In Australia and New Zealand, the series is licensed by Madman Entertainment.

Episode list

OVA

Notes

References

External links
 Official site  
 Anime official site  
 

2013 anime television series debuts
Anime series based on manga
Arms Corporation
AT-X (TV network) original programming
Earth Star Entertainment manga
Funimation
Japanese idols in anime and manga
Professional wrestling comics
Shōnen manga
Wrestling in anime and manga